Ge Ping (born 11 January 1961) is a retired Chinese high jumper.

She won the silver medal at the 1983 Asian Championships, and competed at the 1984 Olympic Games without reaching the final.

Her personal best jump was 1.92 metres, achieved in September 1983 in Shanghai.

References

1961 births
Living people
Chinese female high jumpers
Athletes (track and field) at the 1984 Summer Olympics
Olympic athletes of China